Oreodera dalensi is a species of beetle in the family Cerambycidae. It was described by Tavkilian and Neouze in 2011.

References

Oreodera
Beetles described in 2011